Aeriél Christine Gabrielle "ARI" Miranda (born April 3, 1992) is an American actress and model. She is best known for her recurring role as Shana Fring on Freeform's series Pretty Little Liars (2013–2015). She was first introduced as Shana on the web series, Pretty Dirty Secrets (2012), prior to appearing on Pretty Little Liars. 
Miranda also recurred as Lana on The Nine Lives of Chloe King and The CW series The Tomorrow People. Other roles include Straight Outta Compton (film debut) and the OWN comedy For Better or Worse.

Early life 
Aeriél (better known as "ARI" - a name of endearment given to her by friends, followers and industry professionals) was born and raised in Dallas, Texas having seasonally lived in Boston, Massachusetts and New Orleans, Louisiana. Brought up by youthful parents, her mother is an African-American fine arts enthusiasts and psychology master of Southern Methodist University hailing from Louisiana and her father, a music DJ from New Bedford, Massachusetts. Her paternal family origins are rooted in Cape Verde. She is of mixed West African, Portuguese, Creole, French, German and Jewish descent. Miranda is a Latin-Sephardic surname meaning "she who must be admired".

As a little girl, Aeriél was profoundly inspired by her Nana who introduced cinematic classics such as "The Sound of Music", "West Side Story", "Oliver Twist", "E.T" and tons of Disney animated films to her at an impressionably sweet age. Thus, her interest in the performing arts was born. She studied ballet at Etgen-Atkinson Ballet School and began her theatrical journey by joining and performing in plays for the Dallas Children's Theater. At an early age, she also adopted an affinity for music, learning to play the piano and violin. As a teen, Miranda competed in the fifth season of the Discovery Kids reality competition series Endurance as a member of the Red Team, followed by competing in a family edition of Fear Factor.

Career

Commercials and modeling
Miranda began her work in the modeling industry at the age of 15, appearing in commercials and advertisements for brands such as Nike, Sprite, J.C. Penney, Victoria's Secret, Bed Head by TIGI, Old Navy and Apple.

Television and film
In 2011, Miranda made her television debut on the ABC Family series The Nine Lives of Chloe King. She was a guest on Dr. Phil, speaking on universal issues surrounding teenagers. Miranda went on to appear in various television shows, including The CW science fiction series The Tomorrow People and the TV Land series Jennifer Falls. Miranda was later cast in the Freeform series Pretty Little Liars based on the book series of the same name, from which fans all over the world have recognized her. Miranda later starred in the summer 2015 Universal Pictures film Straight Outta Compton. While making her film debut, her time working with director F. Gary Gray sparked her film production interest. She has guest starred on the Oprah Winfrey Network comedy series For Better or Worse, working alongside Tyler Perry.

Filmography

Film

Television

Web

Producer

References

External links 

 

1992 births
Living people
21st-century American actresses
Actresses from Dallas
American child actresses
American film actresses
American people of Cape Verdean descent
American people of French descent
American people of German descent
American people of Portuguese descent
American television actresses
Participants in American reality television series